Wilhelm Brückner was a German spree killer who killed nine members of his family in Hassenberg and Lindenberg, German Reich during the night of June 6 to June 7, 1925, before committing suicide.

Biography
Brückner, who was described as a withdrawn oddball, worked as a basket maker. He was married twice and had a daughter who was 1 year old at the time of the murders. His first marriage failed after discord with his wife about their religious faith.

When Brückner was about 10 years old his father was struck and killed by lightning, while he himself was left unconscious, an incident that was said to have caused a change of his character. During World War I he was conscripted repeatedly, but was discharged each time due to his mental state, the last and final time in 1917. An evaluation conducted after his murders described him as a hysteric epileptic, suffering from mental retardation.

Brückner had an interest in the supernatural and various books about witchcraft, ghosts, and evocation, as well as two Himmelsbriefe were found among his belongings when police searched his home. He was also interested in notorious contemporary murderers, and was especially occupied with serial killer Fritz Haarmann. It was stated that he had sketched the murderer's head and studied reports about his case in detail. Police also found a note at his workplace reading 
"Massenmörder Haarmann! Massenmörder Denke! Massenmörder ? ? ?" (Mass murderer Haarmann! Mass murderer Denke! Mass murderer ? ? ?) in reference to Fritz Haarmann and Karl Denke, another serial killer whose crimes made headlines at that time.

At the time of the murders Brückner lived, together with his mother, at the house of his sister and her husband, and was said to have argued with them frequently. He was believed to have killed his sister-in-law two years prior to the mass murder, and in the days leading up to June 6 he made various comments that indicated he had planned his crime for some time.

Murders
During the night of June 6, 1925, 31-year-old Brückner cycled to Lindenberg, arriving there at about 11 p.m. He waited for his brother-in-law, Hugo Birnstiel, and accompanied him for a while on his way, but eventually lured him into a forest, where he hit him with a piece of iron on the back of his head. The 19-year-old managed to escape, whereupon Brückner returned to Lindenberg to the house of his parents-in-law where his estranged wife was living. He waited for the pregnant woman at the outhouse and, apparently after she had declined his request to return to him, cut her throat with a knife. While she ran back to the house and died in her father's arms, Brückner made his two-hour trip back to Hassenberg.

There he entered the house of his sister, Wilhelmine Rosenbauer, and killed her, her husband Eduard, and their five children – four girls aged 2, 10, 16 and 19 years, and a boy aged 8 – as well as his own mother by smashing their skulls with an axe and cutting their throats with the kitchen knife. Subsequently, he washed the bodies of his mother and Ilse Brückner, before finally hanging himself at his mother's bed. Police, alerted after the murder of his wife, arrived at the house around 4 a.m., but could only ascertain the deaths of all its inhabitants.

Brückner left a letter where he accused his brother-in-law, Hugo Birnstiel, to have had an incestuous relationship with his own sister (Brückner's wife), which had resulted in her pregnancy. He also alluded to a conflict about some geese with Eduard Rosenbauer, whom he called a savage. It was not believed that these accusations had any foundation in reality though, instead it was suggested that Brückner might have heard imaginary conversations between his wife and Birnstiel that made him believe they had a relationship.

Victims
Among those killed were:

Margarete Barbara Brückner, 71, Wilhelm Brückner's mother
Wilhelmine Karoline Rosenbauer, 41, Wilhelm Brückner's sister
Eduard Rosenbauer, 44, husband of Wilhelmine Rosenbauer
Ilse Brückner
Emmy Brückner

References

1925 suicides
German mass murderers
German murderers of children
20th-century German criminals
Familicides
German spree killers
Mass murder in 1925
Murder–suicides in Germany
Year of birth missing
Basket weavers
Criminals from Bavaria
People from Coburg (district)
Stabbing attacks in Germany
Suicides by hanging in Germany
1925 murders in Germany